The 2022 SaskTel Tankard, the provincial men's curling championship for Saskatchewan, was held from February 9 to February 13 at the Whitewood Curling Club in Whitewood, Saskatchewan. The winning Colton Flasch rink represented Saskatchewan at the 2022 Tim Hortons Brier in Lethbridge, Alberta, Canada's national men's curling championship.

The event was originally going to be played at the Cooperators Centre in Regina, Saskatchewan but was moved to Whitewood due to COVID-19 concerns. The event was awarded to Regina in July 2021, after the 2021 event was cancelled due to the COVID-19 pandemic in Saskatchewan. Its the second time Whitewood has hosted the Tankard. It had previously held it in 2019.

Qualification process
12 teams qualified for the event. Eight teams pre-qualified for the event based on the CTRS points as of January 10, 2022, with the top 4 earning spots based on points earned on SaskTour and World Curling Tour events held in Saskatchewan and the remaining four next best teams earning the next four spots. The remaining four teams qualified through the SaskTel Last Chance Event held January 20 to 23 at the Nutana Curling Club in Saskatoon, and featured 19 teams after two withdrew.

Teams
The teams are listed as follows:

World rankings
Team rankings on the World Curling Team Ranking as of Week 29 of the 2021–22 curling season:

Knockout brackets

Source:

A event

B event

C event

Knockout results
All draw times listed in Central Time (UTC−06:00).

Draw 1
Wednesday, February 9, 7:30 pm

Draw 2
Thursday, February 10, 10:00 am

Draw 3
Thursday, February 10, 3:00 pm

Draw 4
Thursday, February 10, 7:30 pm

Draw 5
Friday, February 11, 10:00 am

Draw 6
Friday, February 11, 3:00 pm

Draw 7
Friday, February 11, 7:30 pm

Draw 8
Saturday, February 12, 10:00 am

Draw 9
Saturday, February 12, 3:00 pm

Playoffs

1 vs. 2
Saturday, February 12, 7:30 pm

3 vs. 4
Saturday, February 12, 7:30 pm

Semifinal
Sunday, February 13, 10:00 am

Final
Sunday, February 13, 3:00 pm

References

External links

2022 Tim Hortons Brier
Curling in Saskatchewan
2022 in Saskatchewan
SaskTel Tankard
Whitewood, Saskatchewan